Gerald James (1917–2006) was a British actor.

Gerald James may also refer to:
Gerald James (cricketer) (1908–1967), Australian cricketer
Gerry James (Gerald James, born 1934), Canadian football and ice hockey player
For the British businessman in the Arms-to-Iraq affair, see Arms-to-Iraq

See also

Jerry James (disambiguation)